Liolaemus elongatus, the elongate tree iguana, is a species of lizard in the family  Liolaemidae. It is native to Argentina and Chile.

References

elongatus
Reptiles described in 1896
Reptiles of Argentina
Reptiles of Chile
Taxa named by Julio Germán Koslowsky